The following is a list of games developed and/or published by Irem (formerly known as IPM) for a variety of arcade and console platforms.

Arcade
1978
 Mahjong / Block Mahjong 
 Nyankoro (P.T. Nyankoro)
1979
 Andromeda (Andromeda 55?) M-10 Hardware
 Commander
 Head On (1979?) M-15
 IPM Invader M-10
 Mahjong DX
 New Block X / New Block Z
 Piccolo
 Power Block
 Space Beam (1979?) M-15
 Space Command
1980
 Panther
 Sky Chuter M-15?
 UniWar S (Ginga Teikoku No Gyakushu or The Galaxy Empire Strikes Back); Galaxian Hardware
 Green Beret
1981
 Demoneye-X M-27 (4 PCB's)/+ M-42-S
 Oli-Boo-Chu (with GDI) / Punching Kid M-47
 WW III / Red Alert (licensed to GDI) M-27
1982
 Moon Patrol (licensed to Williams) M-52
1983
 10-Yard Fight M-52
 Traverse USA / Zippy Race / MotoRace USA (licensed to Williams) M-52
 Tropical Angel M-52
1984
 The Battle Road M-62
 Kung-Fu Master (licensed to Data East) (Spartan X in Japan) M-62
 Lode Runner (licensed from Broderbund) M-62
 Lode Runner II: The Bungeling Strikes Back (licensed from Broderbund) M-62
 Wily Tower M-63
1985
 Atomic Boy (licensed to Memetron) (variant of Wily Tower) M-63
 Horizon M-62
 Kung Fu (PlayChoice-10) (licensed to Nintendo)
 Lode Runner III: The Golden Labyrinth (licensed from Broderbund) M-62
 Lot Lot M-62
 Spelunker (licensed from Broderbund) M-62
1986
 Kid Niki: Radical Ninja / Kaiketsu Yanchamaru M-62
 Lode Runner IV - Teikoku Kara no Dasshutsu M-62
 Youjyuden M-62
1987
 Battle Chopper / Mr. Heli no Dai-Bouken M-72
 R-Type (licensed to Nintendo of America) M-72
1988
 Image Fight M-72
 Meikyūjima (developed by Nanao)
 Ninja Spirit/Saigo no Nindou M-72
 Vigilante (licensed to Data East) M-75
1989
 Dragon Breed M-81
 Legend of Hero Tonma M-72
 R-Type II M-82/ 84 (jap)
 X-Multiply M-72
1990
 Air Duel M-72?
 Hammerin' Harry / Daiku no Gen-san: Beranmechō Sōdōki M-82/72 different versions
 Major Title M-82
 Pound for Pound (Irem US) M-85
 Spelunker II: 23 no Kagi (licensed from Broderbund) M-62
1991
 Blade Master M-92?
 Dynablaster / Bomber Man / Atomic Punk (licensed from Hudson Soft) M-90
 Cosmic Cop / Gallop - Armed Police Unit M-72
 Gunforce - Battle Fire Engulfed Terror Island M-92 A
 Hasamu M-90
 Ken-Go / Lightning Swords M-84
 Lethal Thunder / Thunder Blaster M-92
1992
 Bomber Man World / New Dyna Blaster - Global Quest / New Atomic Punk - Global Quest  
 Hook M-99 A
 Major Title 2 - Tournament Leader / The Irem Skins Game M-92 F
  M-92
 Quiz F-1 1,2finish M-97
 R-Type Leo M-92
 Undercover Cops M-92
1993
 Air Assault / Fire Barrel M-107
 In The Hunt / Kaitei Daisensou M-92 E
 Ninja Baseball Bat Man M-92
 Perfect Soldiers / Superior Soldiers (US) M-92 G
 Risky Challenge / Gussun Oyoyo M-97
 Hill Climber (redemption game, licensed from Leprechaun)
1994
 Dream Soccer '94 (licensed to Data East) M-92 G (Irem), M-107 (Data East)
 GunForce II M-92 G

Prototypes
 Battle Bird (1985)
 Super Kung-Fu Master (1985)
 Kozoutai Gatcyo (1987)
 Huddle Up (1988)

MSX / MSX2
 1982
 Moon Patrol (1982/1984) (Produced by Dempa) DP-3912011 (GenMSX entry)
 1985
 Kung-Fu Acho (聖拳アチョー) also known as Seiken Acho, produced by Irem and ASCII. (GenMSX entry)
 1986
 Spelunker (licensed from Brøderbund) IM-01 (GenMSX entry)
 10 Yard Fight IM-02 (GenMSX entry)
 Panther (GenMSX entry)
 1987
 Super Lode Runner (licensed from Brøderbund) IM-03 (MSX & MSX2) (GenMSX entry)
 R-Type (1987,1988) IM-04 (MSX & MSX2) (GenMSX entry)

Sharp X68000
1989
R-Type
1990
Image Fight

Famicom / NES
 1985
 Kung Fu (licensed to Nintendo) (Spartan X in Japan)
 Zippy Race
 10-Yard Fight
 Spelunker
 Lot Lot
 1986
 Sqoon
 Deadly Towers
 1987
 Spelunker II: Yūsha e no Chōsen
 Kid Niki: Radical Ninja / Kaiketsu Yanchamaru
 1988
 The Guardian Legend
 Napoleon Senki
 Hototogisu
 1989
 Nishimura Kyoutarou Mystery: Blue Train Satsujin Jiken
 Holy Diver
 Major League
 Gekitotsu Yonku Battle
 Shinsenden
 1990
 Image Fight
 Nishimura Kyoutarou Mystery: Super Express Satsujin Jiken
 Kickle Cubicle
 Paaman: Enban wo Torikaese!!
 1991
 Metal Storm
 Kaiketsu Yanchamaru 2: Karakuri Land
 Spartan X 2 (the American localization, known as Kung Fu II, was cancelled)
 Hammerin' Harry / Daiku No Gen-San
 Paaman Part 2
 1992
 Taiyou no Yuusha Firebird
 1993
Ai Sensei no Oshiete: Watashi no Hoshi
Kaiketsu Yanchamaru 3: Taiketsu! Zouringen
Daiku no Gen-san 2: Akage no Dan no Gyakushuu

Famicom Disk System
1986
Kineko
1987
Kineko II
Super Lode Runner
Mahjong Kazoku
Super Lode Runner II
Yōkai Yashiki

Game Boy
 1990
 Shisenshou: Match-Mania
 1991
 Racing Damashii
 Ganso!! Yancha Maru
 Kung Fu Master
 R-Type
 Taiyou no Yuusha Firebird
 1992
 Hammerin' Harry: Ghost Building Company / Daiku no Gen-san: Ghost Building Company
 Kizuchida Quiz Da Gen-San Da!
 Noobow
 R-Type II
 1993
 Saigo no Nindou: Ninja Spirit
 Shuyaku Sentai Irem Fighter
 Undercover Cops
 1994
 Daiku No Gen-San: Robot Teikoku No Yabou (1994)

Game Boy Color
 2000
 Daiku no Gensan - Kachikachi no Tonkachi ga Kachi

Super Famicom / Super NES
 1991
 Super R-Type
 1992
 The Irem Skins Game (known as Major Title in Japan and Europe)
 DinoCity
 GunForce
 1993
 R-Type III: The Third Lightning (Super NES version published by Jaleco in 1994.)
 Street Combat (it is NCS' first Super Famicom Ranma 1/2 fighting game, with the license removed)
 Rocky Rodent (Nitro Punks Mightheads in Japan)
 Ganbare! Daiku no Gen-san
 Undercover Cops (Super NES version unreleased. Super Famicom version published by Varie in 1995.)

PC Engine / TurboGrafx-16
1988
R-Type
1989
Vigilante
Mr. Heli no Daibōken
1990
Image Fight
Saigo no Nindō
1992
Legend of Hero Tonma
Racing Damashi
1993
Gekisha Boy

PC Engine CD ROM / TurboGrafx-16 CD ROM
1991
R-Type Complete CD
1992
Image Fight II
1993
Eiyū Sangokushi
1994
Sol Moonarge

PlayStation and Sega Saturn
 1995
 In the Hunt
 1996
 Irem Arcade Classics; compilation includes: Kung-Fu Master, 10-Yard Fight and Zippy Race.
 Zoku Gussun Oyoyo
 Yoyo's Puzzle Park
 1998
 R-Types (PlayStation only)
 1999
 R-Type Delta (PlayStation only)
 2000
 Katon-Kun

PlayStation 2
 2001
 Gekibo 2 / (the European localization, known as Polaroid Pete, was cancelled)
 2002
 Sub Rebellion
 Disaster Report
 2003
 R-Type Final
 2004
 Sakurasaka Shouboutai
 2005
 Steambot Chronicles
 Blokus Portable: Steambot Championship/Blokus Club with Bumpy Trot
 2006
 Raw Danger!

PlayStation 3
2009
Minna de Spelunker; downloadable from the PSN Store.
Zettai Zetsumei Toshi 4: Summer Memories; Scheduled to be released Spring 2011, the fourth game in the survival horror Zettai Zetsumei Toshi series was cancelled as a result of the Tōhoku earthquake. Development was later resumed by the newly formed developer Granzella after they had acquired the intellectual property from Irem. The game would eventually be released on the PlayStation 4 under the title Zettai Zetsumei Toshi 4 Plus: Summer Memories, though Irem would not assist in the development or release of this final product.

PlayStation Portable
2007
R-Type Tactics
2008
Hammerin' Hero
Steambot Chronicles: Battle Tournament
2009
Zettai Zetsumei Toshi 3: Kowareyuku Machi to Kanojo no Uta
Mawaskes
R-Type Tactics II: Operation Bitter Chocolate
Sengoku Efuda Yuugi: Hototogisu Ran
2010
Sengoku Efuda Yuugi: Hototogisu Tairan
Narisokonai Eiyuutan: Taiyou to Tsuki no Monogatari
2011
Doki Doki Suikoden

Xbox 360
2008
R-Type Dimensions

References

 List of Irem games
Irem games